The 2020 FAI Cup was the 100th edition of the Republic of Ireland's primary national cup competition. This edition featured clubs exclusively from the League of Ireland Premier Division and the First Division, whereas usually non-league teams are involved. The number of teams was reduced due to the ongoing Coronavirus pandemic. The restrictions also meant that crowds were restricted or prohibited from attending. The competition began on 10 August 2020 with the first of four rounds and concluded on 6 December 2020 with the final at the Aviva Stadium in Dublin, a nominally neutral venue, which has hosted the final since 2010.

The Cup holders were Premier Division side Shamrock Rovers and they again reached the final where they were defeated 4-2 by Dundalk after extra-time.
 
The winners of the FAI Cup earns automatic qualification for the 2021–22 UEFA Europa Conference League and would begin play in the first qualifying round. If they have already qualified for European competition through position in the 2020 Premier Division, the spot will go to league's fourth place finisher Sligo Rovers.

First round

The draw for the first round took place on 13 July 2020. Thirteen teams were drawn out to receive a bye into the second round and will join the winners of the first round matches. 
Teams in bold advanced to the Second Round.

Second round

The draw for the second round took place on 12 August 2020 and was broadcast live on the Football Association Ireland Facebook page with Republic of Ireland senior manager Stephen Kenny conducting proceedings. 6 of the 8 games from the second round will be shown live on the new streaming service WATCHLOI.

Teams in bold advanced to the quarter-finals.

Quarter-finals

The draw for the quarter-finals took place on 18 September 2020 after the league game of Sligo Rovers vs. Bohemians live on RTÉ2. Former Sligo Rovers FAI Cup winning captain Conor O'Grady drew the games.

Semi-finals 

The draw for the semi-finals took place at 6pm on 30 October 2020 live on RTE 2FM.

Final

References 

2020 FAI Cup
FAI Cup seasons
2020 in Irish sport
2020 in Republic of Ireland association football cups

External links